Wonder Park is a 2019 computer-animated adventure comedy film produced by Paramount Animation and Nickelodeon Movies, with Ilion Animation Studios handling animation. The plot follows a young girl who encounters a real version of her magical amusement park run by anthropomorphic animals. The film stars the voice talents of newcomer Brianna Denski, and Matthew Broderick, Jennifer Garner, Ken Hudson Campbell, Kenan Thompson, Ken Jeong, Mila Kunis, John Oliver, Kath Soucie, Norbert Leo Butz and Kevin Chamberlin.

The film was directed by former Pixar animator Dylan Brown in his directorial debut; while he was involved through most of the production period, Paramount Pictures dismissed him in January 2018, citing "inappropriate and unwanted conduct".

Wonder Park was released in 2D and 3D formats in the United States on March 15, 2019, by Paramount Pictures. The film received mixed reviews from critics, who praised the animation and voice acting but criticized the story and tone. The film was also a box office failure, grossing $119 million against a budget of $80–100 million. A television series based on the film was scheduled to debut on Nickelodeon, which would make it the third animated film from Nickelodeon Movies, after Jimmy Neutron: Boy Genius and Barnyard, to serve as the basis for an animated series on the network.

Plot
June Bailey, a girl with a bright imagination, and her mother come up with the story of Wonderland, a magical amusement park run by a group of animals: Boomer, a big blue bear who greets guests; Greta, a wild boar; Gus and Cooper, beaver brothers; Steve, a porcupine who is the park's safety manager and is in love with Greta; and Peanut, a chimpanzee who is the park's leader and has the ability to create rides by listening to June's mother's voice. Over time, June's mother starts to get sick and is sent away for recovery. As a result, June starts alienating from Wonderland and burns the blueprints of the park out of frustration.

Sometime later, June's father sends her to math camp. After misinterpreting a note from her father as a cry for help, June uses her friend Banky to create a distraction on the bus to escape and return home, but instead, she finds a broken-down Wonderland in the woods. The park is currently being surrounded by a cloud named the Darkness; June and the animals attempt to fix Clockwork Swings, the park's mechanism, but are attacked by Chimpanzombies, the park's former plush toys that now empower the Darkness. In the chaos, June gets separated from the animals and finds herself in a floating chamber known as Zero-G Land. There, June finds Peanut hiding from the Darkness where he confesses he felt lost after he stopped hearing the voice in his head. This leads June to realize that the Darkness was created by herself as a result of her cynicism from her mom's illness. The Chimpanzombies break in and take Peanut as their prisoner, but June escapes.

June runs back to the animals to tell them she found Peanut but also confesses that she is responsible for the Darkness. Feeling upset over this revelation, they selfishly abandon her. After noticing the piece of the blueprint and realizing that she has been able to create the ideas for the park herself, June fixes one of the attractions to catch up with the animals and make it to Clockwork Swings. She also explains why she created the Darkness, and seeing that she wants to help, the animals reform the team to save Peanut and Wonderland.

The gang finds the Chimpanzombies taking Peanut to get sucked up into the Darkness. The animals fight back while June rushes to save Peanut by jumping into the void. She promises him that she will provide the voice for his imagination and that he should not let the Darkness take over him, giving him an idea to make a slide out of bendy straws to escape. While the gang and Peanut are riding the slide to avoid the Chimpanzombies, June then notices that Clockwork Swings is attached to her name written in cursive, just like the blueprint piece. With Peanut's help, they get Clockwork Swings back up and running by using her name to move the gears, and clear up Wonderland from the Darkness. A cloud remains over the park, to which June interprets as a reminder to continue to be imaginative.

June returns home, and with it, her now cured mother, and they set up a Wonderland in their backyard. June then shares with other kids the story of Wonderland.

Voice cast
Brianna Denski as June Bailey, an imaginative and optimistic girl who created Wonderland
Sofia Mali as Young June
Jennifer Garner as Mrs. Bailey, June's mother
Matthew Broderick as Mr. Bailey, June's father
John Oliver as Steve, a white porcupine who is the safety officer of Wonderland
Mila Kunis as Greta, a wild boar who is Steve's love interest
Kenan Thompson as Gus, an orange beaver who is Cooper's brother
 Ryan Fitzgerald voices Gus in the Australian version and Joe Sugg in the UK version
Ken Jeong as Cooper, a red beaver who is Gus' brother
 Wippa voices Cooper in the Australian version and Caspar Lee in the UK version
Norbert Leo Butz as Peanut, a chimpanzee who acts as Wonderland's main mascot and ride creator
Ken Hudson Campbell as Boomer, a narcoleptic blue bear who welcomes the visitors to Wonderland
 Tom Baker voices Boomer in the UK version
Oev Michael Urbas as Banky, June's best friend
Kevin Chamberlin as uncle Tony
Eamonn Holmes voices uncle Tony in the UK version
Kate McGregor-Stewart as aunt Albertine
Ruth Langsford voices aunt Albertine in the UK version
Kath Soucie as Bus Counselor Shannon
Catherine Cavadini, and David Arnott provided an additional voice via ADR group.

Production
Wonder Park started development in early 2012, with the story being written by Galaxy Quest and Lemony Snicket's A Series of Unfortunate Events writer Robert Gordon and production commenced in September 2014. In June 2015, it was revealed that Spain's Ilion Animation Studios would produce the fully animated 3D film. In November 2015, Paramount Animation officially announced the project, then titled Amusement Park, with former Pixar animator Dylan Brown helming. The voices in the film were set as Matthew Broderick, Jennifer Garner, Ken Hudson Campbell (originally Jeffrey Tambor), Kenan Thompson, Ken Jeong, Mila Kunis, and John Oliver. For the role of June Bailey, more than 1,500 people auditioned before 11-year-old Brianna Denski of Plymouth, Connecticut, got the role.

In January 2018, it was reported that director Dylan Brown was fired from the production by Paramount Pictures, following an investigation into complaints of "inappropriate and unwanted conduct". Paramount offered the director's credit to multiple key creative personnel on the film, but they refused, fearing the film would be detrimental to their careers. The position went then uncredited in the film. In April 2018, the title of the film was changed from Amusement Park to Wonder Park.

Music
The music for Wonder Park was scored by composer Steven Price. The album was released on March 8, 2019, a week before the film was released into theatres.

Grace VanderWaal recorded the song "Hideaway" for the film.

In April 2018, it was reported that Rachel Platten would perform an original song for Wonder Park. The single, titled "Wonder", was released in March 2019.

Release
Wonder Park was released in 2D and 3D on March 15, 2019, by Paramount Pictures. In January 2017, the film was moved up from its original release date, March 22, 2019, to July 13, 2018. A few months later, it was pushed back from July 13, 2018, to August 10, 2018, and by August 2017, it was pushed back for a final time to March 15, 2019.

Home media 
Wonder Park was released on DVD and Blu-ray on June 18, 2019, and on Digital HD on June 4, by Paramount Home Entertainment.

Reception

Box office

In the United States and Canada, Wonder Park was released alongside Captive State and Five Feet Apart, and was projected to gross $8–14 million from 3,838 theaters in its opening weekend. It made $5.4 million on its first day, including $700,000 from Thursday night previews. It went on to debut to $16 million, which beat projections, though Deadline Hollywood said it was "[not] enough to consider this... production a success." The film fell 45% in its second weekend, grossing $8.8 million, and 43% in its third to $5.0 million.

Critical response
The website's critical consensus reads, "Colorful and energetic but lacking a compelling story, Wonder Park is little more than a competently made diversion for very young viewers." On Metacritic, the film has a weighted average score of 45 out of 100, based on 22 critics, indicating "mixed or average reviews". Audiences polled by CinemaScore gave the film an average grade of "B+" on an A+ to F scale.

Other media

Television series

Prior to Wonder Parks release, Paramount Animation announced that a television series based on the film would debut on Nickelodeon, after the film's theatrical release. This would be the third animated film from Nickelodeon Movies to have a series spin-off, after Jimmy Neutron: Boy Genius and Barnyard, and the first animated film from Paramount Animation to inspire a series spin-off from the film. 

Although a trailer for the series was attached to the Blu-ray release of the film, and its first season, consisting of 20 episodes, was completed between 2019 and early 2020, there have been no updates from Nickelodeon on the project as of 2023. The animatic of the pilot was later posted online in December 2022.

Mobile game
Prior to the film's release, a licensed mobile game titled Wonder Park Magic Rides was released by Pixowl.

Notes

References

External links

 
 

2019 films
2010s American animated films
2019 3D films
2019 computer-animated films
American 3D films
American children's animated adventure films
American children's animated comedy films
American children's animated fantasy films
American computer-animated films
American fantasy adventure films
Animated adventure films
2010s adventure comedy films
Animated films about apes
Animated films about bears
Films set in amusement parks
Films set in parks
Magic realism films
Ilion Animation Studios films
Paramount Animation films
Paramount Pictures animated films
Paramount Pictures films
Nickelodeon Movies films
Nickelodeon animated films
Films scored by Steven Price
Spanish children's films
Spanish animated fantasy films
Spanish adventure comedy films
Films adapted into television shows
3D animated films
2010s children's animated films
2010s children's fantasy films
2010s fantasy adventure films
2019 directorial debut films
2019 comedy films
2010s English-language films